Nikolai Eberhardt was a German émigré physicist and author of From the Big Bang to the Human Predicament (1998).

Biography 
Born 1930 in Estonia, Eberhardt has German, Swedish and Russian ancestry. He studied philosophy in Graz, Austria and physics in Munich, gaining a Physics Diploma in 1957, and a Doctor of Science degree (Dr. rer. nat.) in 1962 from the Institute of Technology in Munich. He served as Professor of Electrical Engineering at Lehigh University (Emeritus from 1995). Intermittently he also served as Adjunct Professor in the Science, Technology and Society program. Besides numerous publications, he has multiple patents to his credit in the areas of color-television tubes, microwave devices, robotics and instrumentation. He was Digest Editor of the 1976 IEEE International Microwave Symposium.

References

External links 
 Lehigh University Faculty Profile
 A review of the latest book
 2009 IPPY Awards
 Partial Patent List
 AES E-Library: A Quasi-Linear Frequency Divider

20th-century German physicists
German science writers
German philosophers
German male non-fiction writers
Year of birth missing (living people)
Lehigh University faculty